The 1988–89 NBA season was Indiana's 13th season in the NBA and 22nd season as a franchise. Despite finishing with a 38–44 record the previous season, the Pacers had the second overall pick in the 1988 NBA draft, and selected Dutch center Rik Smits out of Marist College. The Pacers went through four different head coaches this season; head coach Jack Ramsay resigned after an 0–7 start, then after two games under interim coach Mel Daniels, and 20 games under interim George Irvine, the team hired Dick Versace as their new coach. At midseason, the team traded Wayman Tisdale to the Sacramento Kings in exchange for LaSalle Thompson and Randy Wittman, and dealt Herb Williams to the Dallas Mavericks in exchange for Detlef Schrempf. The Pacers held an 11–35 record at the All-Star break, but played slightly under .500 for the remainder of the season, finishing last place in the Central Division with a 28–54 record. 

Chuck Person averaged 21.6 points and 6.5 rebounds per game, while second-year star Reggie Miller showed improvement, becoming the team's starting shooting guard, averaging 16.0 points and 1.3 steals per game, Vern Fleming contributed 14.3 points and 6.5 assists per game, and Smits provided the team with 11.7 points, 6.1 rebounds and 1.8 blocks per game, and was named to the NBA All-Rookie First Team. 

Following the season, Scott Skiles left in the 1989 NBA Expansion Draft.

Draft picks

Roster

Regular season

Season standings

z - clinched division title
y - clinched division title
x - clinched playoff spot

Record vs. opponents

Game log

Player statistics

Season

Player Statistics Citation:

Awards and records
 Rik Smits, NBA All-Rookie Team 1st Team

Transactions

References

See also
 1988-89 NBA season

Indiana Pacers seasons
Indiana
Indiana
Indiana